Christian De Lorenzi (born 18 February 1981) is a former Italian biathlete.

De Lorenzi represented Italy at 2006, 2010 and 2014 Winter Olympics. He debuted in the Biathlon World Cup in 2002. His best World Cup overall finish was 23rd in the 2010–11 season. He retired after the 2015–16 season, his last competitions being the Italian Championships.

Biathlon results
All results are sourced from the International Biathlon Union.

Olympic Games

*The mixed relay was added as an event in 2014.

World Championships

*During Olympic seasons competitions are only held for those events not included in the Olympic program.
**The mixed relay was added as an event in 2005.

Further notable results
 2004:
 2nd, Italian championships of biathlon
 2nd, Italian championships of biathlon, sprint
 2005: 2nd, Italian championships of biathlon, pursuit
 2006: 3rd, Italian championships of biathlon, pursuit
 2007:
 1st, Italian championships of biathlon, sprint
 1st, Italian championships of biathlon, pursuit
 2nd, Italian championships of biathlon, pursuit
 2008: 1st, Italian championships of biathlon, sprint
 2010:
 1st, Italian championships of biathlon, sprint
 1st, Italian championships of biathlon, pursuit
 2011: 2nd, Italian championships of biathlon, pursuit

References

External links
 
 
 

1981 births
Living people
People from Sondalo
Biathletes of Gruppo Sportivo Esercito
Italian male biathletes
Biathletes at the 2006 Winter Olympics
Biathletes at the 2010 Winter Olympics
Biathletes at the 2014 Winter Olympics
Olympic biathletes of Italy
Sportspeople from the Province of Sondrio